ORP Bielik, formerly HNoMS Svenner (S309), is one of four s in service with the Polish Navy. The vessel and its sister ships were built in the period 1964–1967 by Rheinstahl Nordseewerke GmbH in Emden, West Germany for the Royal Norwegian Navy. The Kobben-class submarines were given to Poland in the 2002–2004 period after having been replaced by s in Norway. Before entering active Polish service the boat was modified in Gdańsk.

Ships built in Emden
1967 ships
Kobben-class submarines of the Polish Navy
Submarines of Poland